John de Horncastle may refer to:

 John Horncastle, bishop
John de Horncastle (MP) for Bristol (UK Parliament constituency)